Sir Charles Declan Morgan PC KC (born January 1951) is a retired judge from Northern Ireland.

Early life
Morgan was born in 1951 and educated at St Columb's College in Derry. He then was educated at Peterhouse, Cambridge, and Queen's University, Belfast. He was called to the Bar of Northern Ireland in 1976 and became a Queen's Counsel in 1994. Between 2002 and 2004, he was Senior Crown Counsel for Northern Ireland. He also served for a time as Judge-In-Residence at the School of Law of Queen's University Belfast.

Judicial career
In 2004, Morgan was appointed a judge of the High Court and knighted. He became Chairman of the Law Reform Advisory Committee for Northern Ireland that same year, and in 2007 was appointed Chairman of the Northern Ireland Law Commission. In 2007, he was appointed to the Family Division of the Court, and in 2008 moved to hearing cases for judicial review.

On 18 June 2009, it was announced that Mr Justice Morgan would succeed Sir Brian Kerr as Lord Chief Justice following the latter's appointment as a Lord of Appeal in Ordinary. He was sworn into office on 3 July 2009.

On 10 February 2010, Morgan was sworn of Her Majesty's Most Honourable Privy Council.

Personal life
Sir Declan is married with three children.

References

1951 births
Northern Ireland King's Counsel
Alumni of Peterhouse, Cambridge
Alumni of Queen's University Belfast
Knights Bachelor
Lord chief justices of Northern Ireland
Living people
Members of the Privy Council of the United Kingdom
High Court judges of Northern Ireland